James Torrey Smith (born January 26, 1989) is a former American football wide receiver. He played college football at the University of Maryland and was drafted by the Baltimore Ravens in the 2011 NFL Draft. He also played for the San Francisco 49ers, Philadelphia Eagles, and Carolina Panthers. Smith is a two-time Super Bowl champion, winning Super Bowl XLVII with the Ravens and Super Bowl LII with the Eagles.

Early life
Smith was born on January 26, 1989, and grew up with his mother Monica Jenkins in Colonial Beach, Virginia and Fredericksburg, Virginia. The oldest of seven children, Smith helped his single mother, who attended Rappahannock Community College in the day and worked at night, with household chores and earned honor roll grades in school. Smith attended Colonial Beach Elementary School until 3rd grade. Smith went on to Stafford Senior High School, where he played basketball as a guard, and football at several different positions. He enjoys fishing as a pastime.

Smith played on the Stafford Indians football team as a quarterback, running back, wide receiver, cornerback, kickoff returner, and punt returner. In Stafford's 2004 game against King George, Smith opened with a 54-yard kickoff return, played quarterback, and scored on a 63-yard punt return. His coach, Roger Pierce, said, "Torrey can do those type of things for us. We expect him to do those things." During his senior year in 2006, Smith had 155 carries for 815 yards and 12 touchdowns, completed nine of 25 passes for 230 yards and two touchdowns, and made three receptions for 81 yards. Over the course of his interscholastic career, Smith returned six kickoffs for touchdowns. He earned all-state kick returner honors as a sophomore, all-district honors as a junior, and honorable mention All-Northwest Region quarterback honors, all-district, and all-area honors as a senior.

As a college prospect, Rivals.com ranked him 30th nationally among dual-threat quarterbacks, Scouts, Inc. ranked him 33rd nationally among wide receivers, and SuperPrep placed him on its Virginia 33. ESPN assessed him as a "do-it-all prospect" and projected him as a wide receiver because of his size and speed. Smith was recruited by Maryland, Penn State, and Virginia Tech. He was shown interest by Virginia, but did not receive a scholarship offer. The Virginia staff, which questioned whether he had recovered his speed after a basketball injury during his junior year, asked Smith to run a 4.5-second 40-yard dash at a Nike combine at Clemson University, which he did. The Virginia staff then asked him to repeat the feat at the University of Virginia campus, but Maryland offered a scholarship, which Smith accepted. He later said, "I kind of hold a grudge against U.Va. a little bit. I'm not afraid to say it. I kind of want to show them that they questioned my speed and whether I was going to get it back. I want to show them that I'm all healed up." Virginia head coach Al Groh said of the Fredericksburg native before the 2009 game against Maryland, "Clearly if we  him being the type of player that he is now, he would be returning kicks for Virginia. So we are not above admitting that there is a player that certainly has turned out to be superior to what many people thought, including ourselves. He's—regardless of what the circumstances were in the past—he is a superior college football player."

College career

2007 season
Smith sat out the 2007 season at Maryland on redshirt status, and was voted the scout team player of the year as a freshman. He was named the scout team player of the week before the Florida State game. In summer camp, Smith adjusted from playing quarterback to wide receiver, a position he had limited experience with in high school. Teammate Darrius Heyward-Bey said, "He's like a sponge. He's taking it all in, asking a lot of questions—and that's good for a receiver." In December, he practiced with the first team after Isaiah Williams suffered an injury.

2008 season

Smith drew praise from the Maryland coaching staff during summer workouts before the 2008 season, and The Washington Times predicted Smith, alongside receiver Ronnie Tyler, would earn significant playing time. He played in all 13 games and started in the last six of the season. He also saw action on special teams as a kickoff returner. Smith recorded 24 receptions for 336 yards and two touchdowns. In its midseason report, The Baltimore Sun credited Smith for often giving an inconsistent Maryland team good field position with his long kick returns.

Against Middle Tennessee, Smith returned four kicks for 86 yards. He made his first career reception for three yards the following week against #23 California. Against Eastern Michigan, Smith recorded two receptions for 58 yards and four kickoffs for 126 yards. Smith tallied his first collegiate touchdown on a third-quarter reception from quarterback Chris Turner in the 20–17 comeback at #20 Clemson. He recorded 144 return yards against Virginia.

In the 26–0 victory over #21 Wake Forest, Smith returned the opening kick 34 yards, and caught two passes for eight yards. Smith made his career first start against NC State and recorded four kickoff returns for 85 yards, which set the school single-season kickoff return yards record for a freshman, surpassing the 566-yard mark set by Da'Rel Scott in 2007. Smith blocked a punt against Virginia Tech, and led the team with 163 all-purpose yards including 62 receiving yards. He recorded one reception for 12 yards against 16th-ranked North Carolina.

In the latter part of the season, Smith increased his role and was elevated over Isaiah Williams as the number-two receiver across from Darrius Heyward-Bey. Head coach Ralph Friedgen explained that his presence would alleviate the coverage on Heyward-Bey and praised Smith's blocking ability in the running game. Against Florida State, Smith broke the school record for single-season kickoff return yards, previously held by cornerback Josh Wilson. He had 119 all-purpose yards, including one 13-yard reception. Smith posted his season-best performance against 21st-ranked Boston College with 245 all-purpose yards and eight receptions for 115 yards and a touchdown.

In the 2008 Humanitarian Bowl, he returned a kickoff 99 yards for a touchdown against Nevada, which broke the bowl's previous return record of 98 yards. It was also the first time a Maryland player returned a kickoff for a touchdown in a bowl game. At the end of the season, Smith had returned 42 kickoffs for 1,089 yards, which set a new Atlantic Coast Conference single-season record. Smith led the team with 1,425 all-purpose yards, which put him ahead of starting running back Da'Rel Scott who compiled 1,304 yards.

2009 season
Before the 2009 season, Smith reportedly struggled in Maryland's summer camp, dividing his time between practice and online courses at night. Towards the end of camp, head coach Ralph Friedgen noted an improvement in his performance, which reestablished Smith as the team's top receiver alongside Adrian Cannon.

During the season, Smith saw action in all twelve games, including ten as a starter, and he amassed 61 receptions for 824 receiving yards and five touchdowns, 51 kickoff returns for 1,309 yards and two touchdowns, and eleven rushing attempts for 59 yards and one touchdown. His kickoff return yardage surpassed the ACC single-season record that he had set the previous year. Smith finished the season ranked sixth in the nation in all-purpose yards. He was one of two players, alongside Donald Buckram of UTEP, to record more than 260 all-purpose yards in three games. Smith led the team in receptions, receiving yards and return yards. Smith's 2,192 all-purpose yards were the second-most ever recorded by an ACC player behind only C. J. Spiller of Clemson.

In the season opener at #12 California, he caught one pass for 28 yards and made two rushing attempts for 16 yards. Against Division I FCS James Madison, Smith caught eight passes for 80 yards, rushed twice for 22 yards and a touchdown, and returned four kickoffs 127 yards, including one 81-yard touchdown return. Despite the strong statistical performance, head coach Ralph Friedgen said, "To be honest with you, I was kind of expecting more out of Torrey. I've got a lot of faith in him. I'm not surprised at all about the return yards. But I think if you asked Torrey, he has high expectations for himself, too." Smith agreed with the criticism, and acknowledged that in his second season as a wide receiver, he had room for improvement. He recorded five catches for 165 yards and two touchdowns in the Middle Tennessee game, and caught four passes for 112 yards against Rutgers. He led the team with three receptions for 64 yards and a 29-yard touchdown against Clemson, and became the first player in the nation to reach 1,000 all-purpose yards on the season. Against Wake Forest, Smith returned six kickoffs 194 yards and caught a career-high ten passes for 70 yards and a touchdown. For his performance, he was named the Atlantic Coast Conference Specialist of the Week. Wake Forest head coach Jim Grobe said, "This kid is probably a better receiver [than Darrius Heyward-Bey]. He catches the ball better, he's got great foot speed. He can hurt you running the ball or catching it. Everywhere you look, he's a problem."

Coach Friedgen named Smith the special teams captain for the Virginia game. During the game, Virginia chose to kick short to keep the ball away from Smith on kickoffs, and quarterback Chris Turner did not target him until the fourth quarter. He finished with three receptions for 34 yards and no returns. He recorded two receptions for 13 yards at Duke. At NC State, he caught eight passes for 64 yards and returned a kickoff 84 yards for a touchdown. During the game, he surpassed the ACC single-season kickoff return yards record which he had set the previous season. He had four receptions for 55 yards against 21st-ranked Virginia Tech, seven receptions for 71 yards against Florida State, and six receptions for 68 yards and a touchdown against Boston College.

After the season, the Atlantic Coast Sports Media Association named Smith to the All-ACC second team as both a wide receiver and return specialist. Phil Steele's and The Sporting News named him to their All-ACC first teams as a wide receiver. Phil Steele's and Rivals.com named him to their All-ACC second teams as a kick returner. Smith submitted his name to a panel of NFL scouts after the season, which evaluated him as a third- or fourth-round selection in the 2010 NFL Draft.

2010 season
Smith returned to Maryland for the 2010 season to increase his NFL draft stock, complete his criminology and criminal justice degree in December, and improve the team's record from a 2–10 finish the year prior. He said, "I'll have the same talk with the same people [about the draft]. But my focus is to change what happened last year." Prior to the start of the season, the coaching staff planned to increase Smith's efficiency by playing him fewer snaps in an attempt to keep him fresh. In the Red–White spring game, Smith accounted for 90 of starting quarterback Jamarr Robinson's 146 passing yards, including a "fingertip catch in the end zone" on the opening drive, and the two roommates were reported to have developed a good rapport. Before the season, Smith was named to the watchlists for the Paul Hornung Award and Biletnikoff Award.

Maryland started the 2010 season against Navy, which intentionally kicked away from the elusive return man. In the home opener against , Smith scored on a 24-yard pass from backup quarterback Danny O'Brien and a five-yard pass from starter Jamarr Robinson. Smith scored two touchdowns of 60 and 80 yards in Maryland's failed comeback attempt at 21st-ranked West Virginia, 31–17. After the West Virginia game, Sports Illustrated considered Smith a rising prospect for the 2011 NFL Draft and described him as "a true vertical threat who has NFL size and home-run hitting speed." Redshirt freshman Danny O'Brien secured the starting quarterback position after Jamarr Robinson suffered a shoulder injury, and the rookie soon "found great chemistry" with Smith. Against Florida International, Smith made eight receptions for 159 yards, including a 68-yard touchdown catch and a 32-yard catch that set up another score. He limped off of the field after his touchdown catch, but later said, "I was fine. I was Jim Brown-ing." The following week, he was limited in practice, but started against Duke and caught a 44-yard reception during a first-half scoring drive. However, the lingering ankle ailment continued to bother Smith, and head coach Ralph Friedgen considered using punt returner Tony Logan for kickoff returns until he fully healed. Smith had four receptions for 55 yards in the 31–7 loss to Clemson, but was hindered by his sore ankle which kept him out of practice. Smith said, "I don't like sitting out [practices]. I feel like I'm leaving my teammates out to dry. I didn't battle with them all week." After the game, Friedgen said in the future he would sit players who could not practice by the Thursday before a game.

Against Boston College, running back Da'Rel Scott handled some of the kickoff return duties, but Smith returned two for 38 yards. He also caught eight passes for 34 yards and a touchdown. The following week, Maryland clinched bowl eligibility with a 62–14 rout of Wake Forest. Regarding the turnaround from the previous season's 2–10 record, Smith said, "We expected to be in this position. No one else expected it," but added "No one is going to respect us [yet] because we have not beaten any top dogs." In the game, Smith had five catches for 66 yards, including a 17-yard touchdown reception. Before the game against Miami, the coaching staff reported Smith's ankle had improved and he was "as healthy as he has been in a while." Against Miami, he had three receptions for 35 yards. Smith also compiled 46 yards on two kickoff returns to break the ACC career kickoff return yards record with 2,724 yards, which surpassed the previous mark of 2,688 yards held by Brandon Tate of North Carolina.<ref>Andy Johnston, ACC Notes , The Atlanta Journal-Constitution, October 26, 2010.</ref> At Virginia, Smith took advantage of the Cavaliers' man-to-man coverage and had seven receptions for 157 yards, including a 12-yard touchdown. On a 62-yard catch, he said he was tackled on the seven-yard line only because he was exhausted. Quarterback Danny O'Brien expressed his readiness to throw deep passes to Smith in single coverage, "If it's even, I put it up." Maryland entered the game against 25th-ranked Florida State in contention for the ACC Atlantic Division championship. Smith recorded a phone message and video appealing to fans in a bid to improve home attendance, which had been lackluster throughout the season. The game was attended by 48,115 spectators, which surpassed the athletic department's projections. Maryland lost, 30–16, and Smith had seven receptions for 69 yards.

Smith delivered a record-setting performance against #23 North Carolina State, in which he collected a career-high 14 receptions for 224 yards and four touchdowns. Smith scored on catches of 10, 11, 12, and 71 yards, and his performance helped Maryland win, 38–31, despite amassing negative rushing yards. During the game, Smith set the school record for career all-purpose yardage, which surpassed Lamont Jordan's previous mark of 4,960 yards. His four touchdown receptions in a single game also set a school record, which surpassed the previous mark of three shared by Vernon Davis, Guilian Gary, Jermaine Lewis, and James Milling. Smith's season tally of twelve touchdowns also set a school record, which surpassed the mark of nine shared by Jermaine Lewis and Marcus Badgett. He also joined Marcus Badgett as just the second Maryland receiver to accumulate over 1,000 yards in a single season.Heather Dinich, Torrey Smith talks about his future , ESPN, November 27, 2010. For his performance, the Atlantic Coast Conference named him the Offensive Back of the Week.

Upon the conclusion of the regular season, the Atlantic Coast Sports Media Association named Smith to the All-ACC first team as a wide receiver. In the 2010 Military Bowl against East Carolina, Smith had two catches for ten yards. Shortly after the game, he declared himself available for the 2011 NFL Draft in order to financially support his family. ESPN draft analyst Mel Kiper Jr. said, while he believed Smith could have potentially reached first-round status with another year, he would likely be selected in the second or third round of the 2011 NFL Draft.

College statistics

Professional career

2011 NFL Combine

Baltimore Ravens

2011 season

The Baltimore Ravens selected Smith with the 58th overall pick in the second round of the 2011 NFL Draft. Smith, who ran the 40-yard dash in 4.41 seconds at the combine, was described as a deep threat that the team had missed the previous season.

After facing criticism for a lack of production in the first two weeks, Smith turned in a record-setting performance against the St. Louis Rams in Week 3. In the first quarter, he scored on each of his first three career receptions with 74-, 41-, and 18-yard touchdowns. The 74-yard score was the longest completion of quarterback Joe Flacco's career until it was tied, then surpassed in 2013 and 2014 respectively. He became the first NFL rookie, and only the 12th player, to amass three touchdown receptions in a single quarter. Smith finished the game with five receptions for 152 yards in the 37–7 victory.
 
Smith caught a 26-yard game-winning touchdown against the division rival Steelers on November 6, 2011. On November 20, 2011, Smith made 6 receptions for a Ravens rookie record 165 yards against the Cincinnati Bengals, including a 49-yard touchdown from Joe Flacco.

He finished the season with Ravens rookie records of 50 receptions, 841 receiving yards, 52.6 yards per game, and 7 receiving touchdowns (the last led the team and was tied two years later by Marlon Brown).

In the AFC Championship Game, the Ravens faced the number-one seeded New England Patriots. He finished the loss with three catches for 82 yards.

2012 season

The morning before Baltimore's Week 3 NBC Sunday Night Football'' rematch with the Patriots, Smith's younger brother Tevin Jones died in a motorcycle accident, leaving the former distraught. To honor his late brother, Smith played and led his team in receptions (6), receiving yards (127) and receiving touchdowns (2) and helped the Ravens win 31–30. He was given the game ball for his performance.

In a Week 10 matchup against the Oakland Raiders, Smith caught two passes for touchdowns, and totaled 67 yards in the 55–20 win. On November 23, Smith recorded a season-high 144 yards, seven catches in an overtime victory over the San Diego Chargers.

Smith finished the year with 48 catches, 855 yards and a then-career-high 8 touchdown receptions.

In the Divisional Playoff Round against the Denver Broncos, Smith caught both a 59-yard pass and a 32-yard pass for touchdowns in a 38-35 double overtime win. He finished the game with three catches, 98 yards and the pair of touchdowns.

The Ravens would go on to win Super Bowl XLVII against the San Francisco 49ers 34–31, earning Smith his first Super Bowl ring. Smith ended the game with two catches for a total of 35 yards.

2013 season
Due to the trading of wide receiver Anquan Boldin in free agency, Smith started the 2013 season as the Ravens starting receiver.

Smith caught seven passes for 85 yards in Week 2, and five passes for 92 yards in Week 3. He scored his first touchdown of the season in a Week 4 loss to the Buffalo Bills. He finished the game catching five passes for a total of 166 yards, and even had a 74-yard catch. On October 6, 2013, Smith caught six passes for 121 yards in a win against the Miami Dolphins.

Smith had back-to-back touchdowns in Weeks 10 and 11 against the Bengals and Bears. In a Thanksgiving matchup with the Steelers, Smith caught a 54-yard pass on the Ravens' first offensive play of the game, and a touchdown pass three plays later. His finished the 22–20 win with six catches for 93 yards and a touchdown.

Smith reached the 1,000 yard receiving season mark for the first time in his career in Week 15 . He was also the first Raven's-drafted receiver to eclipse 1,000 yards for the team. Smith finished the year with 65 receptions, 1,128 yards and four touchdowns.

2014 season
Smith began the season as the Ravens' starting wide receiver but eventually lost the job to veteran Steve Smith Sr.

On October 26, 2014, Smith caught four passes for 51-yards and two touchdowns, as he helped Joe Flacco set the NFL record for the fastest time to record five touchdown passes (16 minutes and 3 seconds). The Ravens defeated the Tampa Bay Buccaneers 48–17. The following week, against the Atlanta Falcons, Smith would score the game-sealing touchdown. With less than two minutes left in the game and facing a fourth down, Flacco threw a pass to Smith, and he caught it in for a 39-yard score. Smith would finish the game with three receptions, 81 yards and the 39 yard touchdown, as the Ravens won 29–7.

On November 24, the Ravens faced the New Orleans Saints. Smith was tied with Saints wide receiver Kenny Stills as the game's leading receiver, having five receptions for 98-yards as the Ravens won 34–27.

The following week, on the first possession, Smith scored the game's opening touchdown against the San Diego Chargers, after juggling the ball in the endzone. Smith played his best game of the season, catching six receptions for 65-yards and the pair of touchdowns in the Raven's 33–34 loss.

In their regular season finale, the Ravens took on their division rivals, the Cleveland Browns, needing a win and a Chargers loss to get into the playoffs. Trailing 10–6 in the final quarter, Smith caught a deep pass from Flacco, and on the very next play, a 16-yard touchdown to give Baltimore the lead. Smith finished the game with four receptions for 83 yards, including two decisive fourth quarter plays. Baltimore won and San Diego lost.

In the Wild Card round of the playoffs, the Ravens faced the division rival Steelers. They would win the game 30–17, and Smith would make 2 catches for 28 yards and a touchdown. In the divisional round, the Raven's lost 31–35 to the eventual Super Bowl XLIX champions, the New England Patriots.

Smith finished the season with 49 receptions, 767 yards and a career-high 11 touchdown catches. He also had three games in which he scored multiple touchdowns.

During March 2015, Smith sent a letter to the entire city of Baltimore, announcing that he would test free agency. The letter was a goodbye note, which thanked Baltimore, Ravens' fans and the entire Baltimore Ravens organization for starting out his career on such a strong note.

He left the organization as the franchise record holder in yards per catch both in the regular season (16.9) and the playoffs (20.7) in addition to multiple rookie records (see "2011" above).

San Francisco 49ers

2015 season
On March 10, 2015, Smith signed a five-year, $40 million contract ($22 million guaranteed) with the San Francisco 49ers. Smith would start alongside former Raven's teammate Anquan Boldin.

In his season-opening debut with the San Francisco 49ers, Smith caught one pass for 11 yards in the 20–3 victory over the Minnesota Vikings. The following game, Smith caught six passes for a season-high 120 receiving yards and a 75-yard touchdown, followed up with a two-point conversion catch during the 49ers 43–18 loss to the Steelers. On September 27, 2015, Smith started his first game of the season, but registered no catches in a 47–7 loss to the Arizona Cardinals. The following week, Smith caught two passes for a total of 54-yards, but the 49ers loss to the Green Bay Packers team, losing 17–3.

He would finish the year with 33 receptions, 663 receiving yards and four touchdowns, three of his scores having been over 70 yards.

2016 season
In the 49ers Week 2 matchup against the Carolina Panthers, Smith caught three passes for 55-yards and a touchdown in the 46–27 loss. The next week, Smith caught three passes for 35-yards in a 37–18 loss to the Seattle Seahawks.

On October 16, 2016, Smith caught three passes for 76 yards and a 53-yard touchdown during a 45–16 loss to the Buffalo Bills.

On December 11, 2016, Smith suffered a concussion after hitting his head hard on the turf with his helmet on during a 23–17 loss to the New York Jets. He was placed on injured reserve on December 23, 2016.

On March 7, 2017, Smith was released by the 49ers.

Philadelphia Eagles

On March 9, 2017, Smith signed a three-year, $15 million contract with the Philadelphia Eagles with second and third-year options at the same salary. The signing reunited him with former teammates Corey Graham and Dannell Ellerbe. On September 10, 2017, in the season-opening 30–17 victory over the Washington Redskins, Smith made his Eagles debut. On the day, he had one reception for 30 yards. On October 8, 2017, Smith caught a 59-yard touchdown pass from quarterback Carson Wentz, marking his first touchdown as a member of the Eagles. He finished the 34–7 victory over the Arizona Cardinals with three receptions and 70 receiving yards.

The Eagles finished the season 13–3 to earn the #1 seed in the NFC and a first-round bye. Smith finished the season with 36 catches for 430 yards and 2 touchdowns. In the Divisional Round against the Atlanta Falcons, Smith recorded 3 catches for 39 yards in a 15–10 victory. In the NFC Championship Game against the Minnesota Vikings, Smith had 5 catches for 69 yards and caught a touchdown pass in the 38–7 victory. The Eagles advanced to their third Super Bowl in franchise history where they defeated the New England Patriots in Super Bowl LII. Smith caught 5 passes for 49 yards, earning his second Super Bowl ring.

Carolina Panthers

On March 14, 2018, the Eagles traded Smith to the Carolina Panthers for cornerback Daryl Worley. He played in 11 games with six starts, recording 17 catches for 190 yards and two touchdowns.
Smith was released on September 1, 2019, and announced his retirement two days later.

NFL career statistics

Regular season

Ravens franchise records
Career:
 Yards per reception, regular season: 17.4
 Yards per reception, playoffs: 20.7

Rookie Season (2011):
 Receptions: 50
 Receiving yards: 841
 Receiving yards per game: 52.6
 Receiving touchdowns: 7 (shared with Marlon Brown)
 Total touchdowns: 7 (shared with Marlon Brown)
 Games with 100+ yards receiving: 2
 Games with 3+ total touchdowns: 1

Single game, rookie:
 Receiving yards: 165 (2011-11-20 CIN)
 Yards per reception: 30.4 (2011-09-25 @STL)
 Receiving touchdowns: 3 (2011-09-25 @STL)
 Total touchdowns: 3 (2011-09-25 @STL)

Post-football career and honors
Smith founded the non-profit Torrey Smith Foundation (TSF), whose mission is to provide support to at-risk youth with physical, educational, and financial challenges, and to focus on the enhancement of lives of those affected by domestic violence. It sponsors back-to-school and after-school activities, STEM camps, charitable basketball games and holiday meal and gift programs, among other activities. The TSF's website states its goals as:  Education of youth on subjects useful to the individual and beneficial to the community, Increasing the awareness of financial and hands on support needed in the fight against domestic violence and supporting other organizations conducting charitable activities that align with the TSF mission. For the past 2 years, Torrey has participated in the Madieu Williams Football Camp, a free camp held by the former Bengals and Vikings safety for kids ages 6–14.

In March 2013, Smith worked as an intern for Maryland Rep. Elijah Cummings, working out of Baltimore. 
On March 28, 2013, the Ravens picked Smith to represent the team at the Maryland State capital in Annapolis. Smith, along with Ravens' president Dick Cass spoke to the assembled members of the Maryland House of Delegates and then the Maryland State Senate. While a member of the San Francisco 49ers in 2016, Smith was the team's nominee for that year's Walter Payton award for his community involvement.

In 2019, his hometown, Colonial Beach named a park whose restoration and expansion he had funded in Smith's honor. In 2020, the Library of Virginia announced Smith as one of its Strong Men & Women in Virginia History, based on his continuing philanthropic work.

In December 2020, Smith joined Rose Health as an Investor and Brand Ambassador to promote mental health resilience. Rose Health is one of the fastest growing mental health platforms in the United States. Smith has said "the sky is the limit" as to Rose's potential for growth. Smith also said the Rose app has helped him with his own mental health, including figuring out his strengths and weaknesses and how to build his mental health resilience.

Personal life
On September 23, 2012, Smith lost his 19-year-old brother in a motorcycle accident. Tevin Chris Jones was riding on SR 672 in Westmoreland County, Virginia, when he ran off the right side of the roadway and struck a utility pole, according to the Virginia State Police. He was pronounced dead at the scene. He was wearing a helmet, and alcohol was not a factor. The accident is still under investigation. Smith has established a college scholarship fund to assist low-income youth from Maryland, Pennsylvania and Virginia in honor of his late brother.

Smith left the Ravens' hotel on Sunday at 2 a.m. ET, accompanied by a member of the Ravens' security staff, to be with his family. Smith told Ravens coach John Harbaugh that he wanted to play in that night's game against the New England Patriots. Harbaugh told him that it was Smith's call to make. Smith chose to play, and finished the game with 6 receptions for 127 yards and two touchdowns in a 31–30 win over the New England Patriots.

Smith married his longtime girlfriend, Chanel Williams, on July 11, 2013. The two met at the University of Maryland, where Williams ran track and Smith played football. On September 30, 2013, Smith tweeted that his wife is pregnant. On April 4, 2014, Chanel gave birth to their first child, a son named Torrey "TJ" Jeremiah. Torrey's second son, Kameron James, was born on June 22, 2016. The Smiths' third child, a daughter, named Kori Lynn Smith, was born on December 18, 2018.

References

External links
 
 Philadelphia Eagles bio 
 San Francisco 49ers bio 
 Baltimore Ravens bio 
 Maryland Terrapins bio

1989 births
Living people
People from Colonial Beach, Virginia
Sportspeople from Fredericksburg, Virginia
African-American players of American football
Players of American football from Virginia
American football wide receivers
American football return specialists
Maryland Terrapins football players
Baltimore Ravens players
San Francisco 49ers players
Philadelphia Eagles players
Carolina Panthers players
21st-century African-American sportspeople
20th-century African-American people